Emiliano Juan Rey (born January 1, 1975 in Mar del Plata, Buenos Aires) is an Argentine former footballer who played for clubs in Argentina, Chile, Colombia, Ecuador, Peru, Italy and United Arab Emirates.

Teams
  Boca Juniors 1997-1998
  Barcelona 1998
  Deportivo Cali 1999
  Universidad de Chile 1999
  Torres Sassari 2002
  Al Ain 2003
  Aldosivi de Mar del Plata 2003-2005
  Cadetes de Mar del Plata 2006

Titles
  Universidad de Chile 1999 (Chilean Primera División Championship)

References
 
 
 

1975 births
Living people
Argentine footballers
Argentine expatriate footballers
Argentine expatriate sportspeople in Chile
Argentine expatriate sportspeople in Italy
Boca Juniors footballers
Aldosivi footballers
Al Ain FC players
Deportivo Cali footballers
Universidad de Chile footballers
Barcelona S.C. footballers
Club Universitario de Deportes footballers
Categoría Primera A players
Chilean Primera División players
Argentine Primera División players
Expatriate footballers in Chile
Expatriate footballers in Colombia
Expatriate footballers in Ecuador
Expatriate footballers in Peru
Expatriate footballers in Italy
Expatriate footballers in the United Arab Emirates
Argentine expatriate sportspeople in the United Arab Emirates
Sportspeople from Mar del Plata
UAE Pro League players
Association football forwards